Denise is a female given name. Dionysus is the Greek god of wine, and the name Denise means "to be devoted to Bacchus."

Feminine variants
 Deneece, Denice, Deniece: English
 Denisa: Czech, Romanian, Russian, Slovak
 Denise: English, French, Portuguese
 Denisse: English, French
 Deniz: Turkish
 Dennet, Denote, Deonisia, Deonysia: Middle English
 Dinisia: Portuguese
 Dionycia, Dionis: Middle English
 Dionise: Old French (on St. Denise's burial site)
 Dionísia: Portuguese
 Dionisia: Middle English, Italian, Spanish
 Dionizja: Polish
 Dionysia: Greek (Διονυσία), Latin, Middle English
 Diot, Diota, Dye, Dyonese, Dyonisia, Dyonisya, Dyot, Dyota: Middle English

Masculine variants

 Dénes: Hungarian
 Denis: English, French, German, Romanian, Slovak, Slovene, Czech, Russian (Денис), Serbo-Croatian (also Денис)
 Denijs: Middle Dutch
 Deniz: Turkish language
 Dêniz: Portuguese (Brazilian)
 Dennis: English, Dutch, German, Norwegian
 Denny: English
 Denys (Денис): Ukrainian
 Dinis, Diniz, Dionísio: Portuguese
 Dion: English, French (medieval diminutive), Greek (diminutive: Δίων)
 Dionigi: Italian
 Dionise: Romanian
 Dionisije (Дионисије): Serbian
 Dionisio: Italian, Spanish
 Dionisos (Դիոնիսոս): Armenian
 Dionizy: Polish
 Dionysios (Διονύσιος): Greek
 Dionýz: Slovak
 Dénes: Hungarian
 Donnchadh: Irish
 Dzianis (Дзяніс): Belarusian
 Genis (Генис): Udmurt

Notable examples 
In television and film:

Denise Alexander (born 1939), American actress
Denise Coffey (1936–2022), British actress, director and playwright
Denise Crosby (born 1957), American actress
Denise Dowse (1958–2022), American actress and director
Denise Drysdale (born 1948), Australian television personality and comedian, and her self-titled show Denise
Denise Keller (born 1982), Singaporean model and MTV Asia host
Denise Nickerson (1957–2019), American actress 
Denise Richards (born 1971), American actress
Denise Schindler (born 1985), German Paralympic cyclist
Denise Stapley (born 1971), American television personality and sex therapist
Denise Camillia Tan (born 1992), Malaysian-based Singaporean actress
Denyse Tontz (born 1994), American actress, model, and singer
Denise van Outen (born 1974), English actress, singer and TV presenter
Denise Welch (born 1958), English actress and television presenter
Denise Nicholas (born 1944), American actress, author, and activist

In music:

Denyce Graves (born 1964), American opera singer
Denise Ho (born 1977), singer from Hong Kong
Denise Lor (1929–2015), American singer
Deniece Williams (born 1951), American singer
Denise Pearson (born 1968), English singer-songwriter and lead singer of British pop group Five Star

In sport:
Denise Hannema (born 1990), Dutch cricketer
Denyse Julien (born 1960), Canadian badminton player
Denise Lewis (born 1972), British heptathlete
Denise O'Connor (born 1935), American Olympic fencer

In other fields:
Denise Austin (born 1957), American fitness expert
Denese Becker (born 1973), Guatemalan refugee
Denise Domenach-Lallich (1924–2020), French resistance member
Denise Levertov (1923–1977), American poet
Denise Moreno Ducheny (born 1952), American politician
Denise Pumain (born 1946), French geographer
Denise Quiñones (born 1980), Miss Universe 2001 from Puerto Rico
Denise Weston Austin (1925-1997), Northern Irish zookeeper

Fictional characters:
Denise, a character in The Muppets who is Kermit the Frog's new significant other
Denise Huxtable, fictional character on the sitcom The Cosby Show and its spin-off A Different World
Denise Fox, a fictional character on the British soap opera EastEnders

Nickname
Andrée Borrel (1919–1944), French heroine of World War II, with SOE F codename Denise

See also
Dennis
Deniz (given name), pronounced similarly in Turkish

References 

English feminine given names
Feminine given names
French feminine given names